The Anglo-Mysore Wars were a series of four wars fought during the last three decades of the 18th century between the Sultanate of Mysore on the one hand, and the British East India Company (represented chiefly by the neighbouring Madras Presidency), Maratha Empire, Kingdom of Travancore, and the Kingdom of Hyderabad on the other. Hyder Ali and his succeeding son Tipu fought the wars on four fronts: with the British attacking from the west, south and east and the Nizam's forces attacking from the north. The fourth war resulted in the overthrow of the house of Hyder Ali and Tipu (the latter was killed in the fourth war, in 1799), and the dismantlement of Mysore to the benefit of the East India Company, which took control of much of the Indian subcontinent.

The four wars

First Anglo-Mysore War 
The First Anglo-Mysore War (1767 – 1769) saw Hyder Ali enjoy some measure of success against the British, almost capturing Madras. The British convinced Nizam Mir Nizam Ali Khan to attack Ali. That was temporary, however, and the Nizam signed a new treaty with the British in February 1768. Ali had to contend with a British Bombay army attacking on the west and a Madras army attacking from the northeast. However, Hyder's attack towards Madras resulted in the Madras government suing for peace, and the resultant Treaty of Madras.

Second Anglo-Mysore War 
The Second Anglo-Mysore War (1780 – 1784) witnessed bloodier battles with fortunes fluctuating between the contesting powers. Tipu defeated William Baillie at the Battle of Pollilur in September 1780, and John Braithwaite at Kumbakonam in February 1782, both of whom were taken prisoners to Seringapatam. This war saw the comeback of Sir Eyre Coote, the British commander who defeated Ali at the Battle of Porto Novo and Arni. Tipu continued the war following his father's death. Finally, the war ended with the signing of the Treaty of Mangalore on 11 March 1784, which restored the status quo ante bellum. The Treaty of Gajendragad in April 1787 ended the conflict with the Marathas.

Third Anglo-Mysore War 
In the Third Anglo-Mysore War (1790 – 1792), Tipu, now an ally of France, invaded in 1789 the nearby Kingdom of Travancore, a British ally. British forces were commanded by Charles Cornwallis. The resultant war lasted three years and was a resounding defeat for Mysore. The war ended after the 1792 Siege of Seringapatam and the signing of the Treaty of Seringapatam, according to which Tipu had to surrender half of his kingdom to the British East India Company and its allies.

Fourth Anglo-Mysore war 
The Fourth Anglo-Mysore War (1798 – 1799) saw the death of Tipu and further reductions in Mysorean territory. Mysore's alliance with the French was seen as a threat to the East India Company and Mysore was attacked from all four sides. Mysore had 35,000 soldiers, whereas the British commanded 60,000 troops. Nizam Akbar Ali Khan and the Marathas launched an invasion from the north. The British won a decisive victory at the Siege of Seringapatam (1799). Tipu was executed during the defence of the city. Much of the remaining Mysorean territory was annexed by the British, the nizam, and the Marathas. The remaining core, around Mysore and Seringapatam, was restored to the Indian prince Yuvaraja Krishnaraja Wadiyar III (later Maharaja Krishnaraja Wadiyar III) under his grandmother's regency; members of the Wodeyar dynasty had been in power before Ali became the de facto ruler. The Wodeyars ruled the remnant Kingdom of Mysore until 1947, when it joined the Dominion of India.

Aftermath 
After the Battles of Plassey (1757) and Buxar (1764), which established British dominion over East India, the Anglo-Mysore Wars, the Anglo–Maratha Wars (1767 – 1799), and finally the Anglo-Sikh Wars (1845–1849), consolidated the British claim over South Asia, resulting in the British Empire in India, though resistance among various groups such as the Afghans and the Burmese would last well into the 1880s.

Rockets 

The Mysorean rockets used by Tipu during the Battle of Pollilur were much more advanced than any that the British East India Company had previously seen, chiefly because of the use of iron tubes for holding the propellant. This enabled higher thrust and a longer range for the missile (up to ). After Tipu's eventual defeat in the Fourth Anglo-Mysore War and the capture of a number of Mysorean iron rockets, they were influential in British rocket development, inspiring the Congreve rocket, which was soon put into use in the Napoleonic Wars.

See also
 Mysorean invasion of Malabar
 Battle of Nedumkotta
 Regiment de Meuron
 Garrison Cemetery, Seringapatam

References

Further reading
 
 
 
 
 
  – a novel linked to TV series
 https://sites.google.com/vvdatalink.com/vv-datalink/knowledge/history/indian-history/mordern-history/anglo-mysore-wars

18th-century conflicts
18th century in India
History of Karnataka
History of Kerala
Military history of British India
Mysorean invasion of Malabar
Wars involving Great Britain
Wars involving the Kingdom of Mysore